Yamuna Prasad Shastri was a member of Lok Sabha from Rewa, Madhya Pradesh. He was member of Bharatiya Lok Dal later on changed alliance with Janata Party. He was also a member of Madhya Pradesh Legislative Assembly
He participated  in  the Goa Liberation Movement in
1955 and lost his right eye vision due to torture  by  Portuguese  police and later in March 1975 became totally blind. Many schools and colleges have been dedicated in his memory.

References

1927 births
Indian blind people
Goa liberation activists
India MPs 1977–1979
Lok Sabha members from Madhya Pradesh
People from Rewa district
1997 deaths
India MPs 1989–1991
Madhya Pradesh MLAs 1967–1972
Praja Socialist Party politicians
Blind politicians
Indian politicians with disabilities
Janata Party politicians
Janata Dal politicians